Wollongong Wolves FC is an association football club based in Wollongong, Australia. The club was formed in 1980 as has competed at the highest tier of soccer in Australia. Currently, the club participates in the National Premier Leagues NSW competition, which is the second highest tier of soccer in Australia. The club has won one continental championship, two national championships and two state championships.

Key 

 Key to league competitions
 NSL = National Soccer League
 NSW Div. 1 = New South Wales Division One
 NSWPL = New South Wales Premier League
 NPL NSW = National Premier Leagues NSW

Key to colours and symbols:

Key to finals and cup record:
PF = Preliminary Final
PO = Playoff Final
EF = Elimination Final
1R, 2R, 3R...7R = 1st Round, 2nd Round, 3rd Round...7th Round
R32 = Round of 32
R16 = Round of 16
GS = Group Stage
QF = Quarter-finalist
SF = Semi-finalist
RU = Runners-Up
W = Winners

Key to tournaments:
OCC = OFC Club Championship
FCWC = FIFA Club World Cup
NPLF = National Premier Leagues Finals

Seasons

Notes

References

 SoccerAust
 Ozfootball South Coast Wolves

Wollongong Wolves FC seasons
Wollongong Wolves FC
S